Biebl is a German surname that may refer to
Elisabeth Biebl (1915–1989), German operetta singer and actress
Franz Biebl (1906–2001), German composer of classical music 
Heidi Biebl (1941–2022), German alpine skier 
Konstantin Biebl (1898–1951), Czech poet and writer 
Sepp Biebl (born 1936), German speed skater 

German-language surnames